London Overground  (also known simply as the Overground) is a suburban rail network serving London and its environs. Established in 2007 to take over Silverlink Metro routes, it now serves a large part of Greater London as well as the home county of Hertfordshire, with 113 stations  on nine different routes.

The Overground forms part of the United Kingdom's National Rail network but it is under the concession control and branding of Transport for London. Operation has been contracted to Arriva Rail London since 2016. TfL assigned orange as a mode-specific colour for the Overground in branding and publicity including the roundel, on the Tube map, trains and stations.

History

Pre-1999

Rail services in Great Britain are mostly run under franchises operated by private train operating companies, marketed together as National Rail.

The concept of developing a network of orbital services around London goes back to the independently produced Ringrail proposals in the early 1970s. Some of these were evaluated in the London Rail Study of 1974 (the Barren Report) and Barren suggested consideration of a North London Network of orbital services, based on a later suggestion by the Ringrail Group, which involved using many existing rail routes, rather than the new construction suggested in earlier drafts of the Ringrail Plan.

The proposal from Barren was for several overlapping services mainly using the North London line, generally at 20-minute intervals. The suggested routes followed the original North London line service from Broad Street to Richmond, new services from Barking to Clapham Junction, and a third service from Ealing Broadway to North Woolwich. However, the Wilson government's continuing antipathy to the railways, along with British Rail's management's lack of interest in minor local train services, meant that few of these initiatives were carried forward.

In 1979, the then Greater London Council (GLC) decided to sponsor an improved service from Camden Road, on the North London line, to North Woolwich, opening up a previously freight-only line between Dalston and Stratford and linking it to an improved Stratford – North Woolwich service. This was given the marketing name Crosstown Linkline, and operated with basic two-car diesel multiple units.

The next initiative came from the GLC in 1984, when the government supported the Broadgate development that would entail the demolition of Broad Street station. The closure process was convoluted because of problems in making alternative arrangements for the North London line, and the remaining services operating from Watford Junction to the City. These eventually ran to and from Liverpool Street via a new section of track, the Graham Road Curve.

British Rail replaced the existing three-car  electric trains (built 1957) with slightly newer but shorter two-car  electric trains (built 1959), leading to overcrowding. In 1988, by reorganising and reducing services on the Great Northern routes from Moorgate, about 18 relatively modern  dual-voltage electric trains were transferred to operate the North London and Watford services, from both Euston and Liverpool Street.

Several voluntary sector groups, the Railway Development Society (RDS, later Railfuture), Transport 2000's then London groups, and the Capital Transport Campaign, launched a series of leaflets and briefings promoting a concept called Outer Circle. This name had once been used for a semi-circular service from Broad Street to Mansion House, which ceased during World War I.

Mayor of London and GLA

The pamphlets and briefings, first issued in 1997, initially suggested a route from Clapham Junction to the Greenwich Peninsula, intended to improve access from south London to the Millennium Dome. However, this was thwarted by architect Richard Rogers who considered that a railway route on a viaduct could cause "community severance", and so the Victorian brick viaduct was demolished. Nothing further happened to develop this network until after the new Greater London Authority (GLA) was launched in 2000. But the lobbying discreetly continued, with a series of short briefings published by one RDS member based in North London. Mayoral and GLA candidates were approached to discuss the viability of the Outer Circle concept. The principle was widely supported and was adopted into the first Mayor's Transport Plan, published in 2001.

Meanwhile, a pilot scheme was launched in 2003 to bring several National Rail local services, mainly in South London, operated by Connex South Eastern, Southern and South West Trains under the ON – Overground Network brand. TfL introduced consistent information displays, station signage and maps on the selected routes in South London. Although this pilot was primarily an exercise in branding, some service improvements were introduced, and it was the first instance of the newly created TfL having a visible influence over National Rail services. The pilot scheme was later dropped.

In January 2004 the Department for Transport (DfT) announced a review of the rail industry in Great Britain. As part of that review, TfL proposed a "London Regional Rail Authority" to give TfL regulatory powers over rail services in and around Greater London.

A result of this consultation was agreement by the Secretary of State for Transport, Alistair Darling, to transfer the Silverlink Metro services from DfT to TfL control.

When the franchise was split up in 2007, County services were taken over by the London Midland franchise, and the Metro services came under TfL control. TfL decided to let this franchise as a management contract, with TfL taking the revenue risk.

Announcements and launch
On 20 February 2006, the DfT announced that TfL would take over management of services then provided by Silverlink Metro. Tenders were invited to operate the service under the provisional name of the North London Railway. On 5 September 2006, London Overground branding was announced, and it was confirmed that the extended East London line would be included.

On 25 June 2007 a statutory instrument was laid before parliament to exclude the ex-Silverlink metro lines from the franchising process which enabled them to be operated as a concession.

On 11 November 2007, TfL took over the North London Railway routes from Silverlink Metro. The following day there was an official launch ceremony at Hampstead Heath station with the Mayor of London, Ken Livingstone; there was also a later media event on the bay platform at Willesden Junction.

The launch was accompanied by a marketing campaign entitled "London's new train set", with posters and leaflets carrying an image of model railway packaging containing new Overground trains, tracks and staff.

At the launch, TfL undertook to revamp the routes by improving service frequencies and station facilities, staffing all stations, introducing new rolling stock and allowing Oyster pay as you go throughout the network from the outset.

After the takeover, all stations were "deep-cleaned", and Silverlink branding removed. Station signage was replaced with Overground-branded signs using TfL's corporate New Johnston typeface.

On 15 April 2009 the North London line trains at Stratford moved to new high-level platforms 1 and 2 from low-level platforms 1 and 2, which were needed for the Docklands Light Railway's Stratford International service. The new platforms 1 and 2 are an island platform with step-free access to platform 12 and subway links to platforms 3–11.

East London line extension

On 27 April 2010, the East London line became part of the London Overground network when the Phase 1 extension was completed.

Operations began with a limited preview service between Dalston Junction and New Cross/New Cross Gate, with full operation between Dalston Junction and West Croydon/Crystal Palace on 23 May. On 28 February 2011, the line between Dalston Junction and Highbury & Islington was opened. In attendance were the Mayor of London and London Underground's Managing Director. TfL announced in November 2010 that ridership was ahead of forecast at 92,000 a day, and that patronage at Surrey Quays had "gone through the roof".

The incorporation of the East London line into the Overground network has added substantial sections of line in tunnel, including the historic Thames Tunnel, the oldest tunnel under a navigable river in the world. A peculiarity is that at  the London Overground runs below the London Underground (though there are other parts of the network where this occurs, e.g. the Watford Junction to Euston route between Kenton and South Kenton – shared with the Bakerloo line – passes under the Metropolitan line between Northwick Park and Preston Road).

South London line extension

The extension uses an alignment between Surrey Quays and just north of  that had been disused since 1911; new track was laid after some major civil engineering works. This was put on hold in 2009, although a suitable station 'foundation structure' has been built to facilitate completion in the future.

Funding for the railway rebuilding project was secured in February 2009, including £64 million from the DfT and £15 million from TfL, and construction began in May 2011.

The route passes over both  and  stations without stopping, and this lack of interchange stations was criticised by local politicians during the planning phase of the project. No stations are planned at these locations as the line is on high railway arches, making the cost of any station construction prohibitive.

Liverpool Street station services
On 31 May 2015 the Liverpool Street to Enfield Town, Cheshunt (via Seven Sisters) and Chingford services, as well as the Romford to Upminster service, were transferred from Greater Anglia to TfL to become part of the London Overground network.

Network

Introduction
The initial network, service levels and timetables were a continuation of Silverlink Metro services, a set of routes primarily built and electrified by the North London and London & North Western railway companies in the 19th and early 20th centuries. As the Overground name implies, the majority of the network is above ground, and it mostly consists of railway lines that connect areas outside Central London, with a considerable portion of the network in Zone 2. The network also uses  in central London, the southern terminus of the Watford DC line.

The network interchanges with the Bakerloo, Central, District, Hammersmith & City, Jubilee, Northern, Circle, Metropolitan and Victoria tube lines, and also with the Docklands Light Railway, Tramlink and Elizabeth line networks. The Overground lines appear on Tube maps issued by TfL, and a separate map of the system is available.

Much of London Overground passes through less affluent areas, and is seen as contributing to their regeneration. The North London and Gospel Oak to Barking lines were previously considered by the Transport Committee of the London Assembly to be neglected and not developed to their full potential.

Services

, the typical off-peak service pattern is:

Depots
Highbury & Islington to New Cross, Clapham Junction, Crystal Palace and West Croydon services are served by New Cross Gate TMD.

Richmond and Clapham Junction to Stratford, Watford Junction to Euston, and Gospel Oak to Barking services are served by Willesden TMD.

London Liverpool Street to Enfield Town, Cheshunt and Chingford, and Romford to Upminster are served by Ilford EMU Depot, Chingford sidings and Gidea Park Sidings.

Operations

London Overground's head office and control centre are at Swiss Cottage. Rolling stock is maintained at Willesden Junction and New Cross Gate TMDs, the latter being newly built for the extended East London line. There are also sidings at Silwood Triangle (just north of New Cross depot), built in 2013–14. Satellite locations for stabling trains include Stratford, London Euston and sidings (mainly used by London Northwestern Railway), and c2c's East Ham Depot. Train crews are based at stations including Euston, Willesden Junction, Watford Junction, New Cross, Stratford and Gospel Oak. Until recently London Overground operated with a conductor or guard on its North London, West London and Gospel Oak services. With the other 60% of Overground services already operated by only a driver, it was decided in 2013 to convert these remaining two-person operated trains to driver only.

Operator
London Overground is operated by a private company, Arriva Rail London. Following a model similar to that used for the Docklands Light Railway, TfL invited tenders for operation of the Overground. Unlike other National Rail operators under the franchise control of the Department for Transport, TfL sets fares, procures rolling stock and decides service levels. The operator takes only a small element of revenue risk, with TfL taking 90% and the operator 10%.

The first operator, London Overground Rail Operations, a 50:50 joint venture between Laing Rail and MTR Corporation, was chosen by TfL on 19 June 2007. The contract was signed on 2 July 2007 for seven years with the option of a two-year extension. In preparation for the launch of the Overground, MTR Laing renamed itself London Overground Rail Operations. In February 2013, it was awarded a concession extension until 14 November 2016.

In April 2015, TfL placed a notice in the Official Journal of the European Union, inviting expressions of interest in operating the next concession. In March 2016, TfL announced that Arriva Rail London had won the right to operate the London Overground concession, starting from 13 November 2016.

Ticketing

Ticketing is a mix of paper, Oyster cards, electronic smart cards and contactless payment cards for "pay-as-you-go" travel. As with all National Rail and TfL services in London, passengers can use a Travelcard (daily, seven-day, monthly or annual); as on other National Rail services in London, paper single, return and cheap day return tickets priced under the zonal fare scheme are also available.

As part of an effort to improve safety and protect revenue, TfL has announced that it will introduce ticket barriers at a number of stations. The stations that did not have barriers when TfL took over have been fitted with standalone Oyster card readers similar to those at ungated Underground and DLR stations. Typically, this avoids paying for zone 1 when the passenger did not travel into it.

Ticket stock is common National Rail stock, as Overground services remain part of the National Rail network, but sometimes with a large TfL roundel in the centre and the repeated legend "Rail Settlement Plan" or on newer versions "National Rail" on a light green background. This ticket stock, coded "TFL" on the reverse, was introduced in November 2007.

Ticket pricing
Oyster PAYG is charged on the same zone-based rules as for the Underground and the Docklands Light Railway. Stations outside Greater London (except Watford Junction) are included in the new Travelcard Zones 7-9. On 2 January 2008 Acton Central was moved from zone 2 to 3, Hampstead Heath from 3 to 2 and Willesden Junction from 3 to both 2 and 3.

Paper tickets are charged on the same zone-based rules as for Underground and DLR paper tickets, which were expanded to take in the extra zones covered. Watford Junction has its own fare scale. Paper tickets are significantly more expensive than using Oyster PAYG.

Performance

Although a TfL service, the Overground is part of the National Rail network, unlike the Underground. The most recent figures released by Network Rail (NR), for period 7 (20132014), showed that it had achieved 96.6% of the Public Performance Measure (PPM) target for punctuality and reliability set by the ORR – down 0.9 percentage points on the period last year. The moving annual average (MAA) of the PPM for the 12 months to 12 October 2013 was 96.5%. TfL, in conjunction with the Massachusetts Institute of Technology, has investigated the use of data from the Oyster smartcard ticketing system to measure the performance of the Overground explicitly from the passenger perspective.

In the autumn 2011 National Passenger Survey, conducted by Passenger Focus, London Overground received an overall satisfaction rating of 92%, a 7% improvement on the previous survey. However, a survey in February 2014 by the consumer group Which? found that customer satisfaction of London Overground was at sixth place (out of 20 train operators) with a satisfaction percentage of 58%.

Branding

Public presentation is visually associated with TfL design standards, using similar graphic design elements to those used on the Underground. These design standards have been applied to London Overground stations, signage, rolling stock and publicity. London Overground also uses the TfL corporate typeface, New Johnston, on its signage, publicity, and stationery and on its fleet of trains. In common with other TfL services, the Overground is denoted by its own colour, a vivid orange (Pantone 158C). The orange colour was inherited from the former East London line prior to its transfer from Underground to Overground.

London Overground lines are shown on the tube map in orange; the map does not use colours to distinguish between the different Overground lines. Like the Docklands Light Railway and the Elizabeth line, the Overground is represented by a double line rather than a solid single line, to distinguish it from the colour-coded Underground lines. The London Overground also uses a variant of the TfL roundel. TfL denotes its different transport modes such as London Underground and London Buses with variants of the roundel device using a range of colours, and the London Overground version consists of an orange ring with a blue bar. The roundel has its origins in a 1933 design by the London Passenger Transport Board and has spawned many variations. All Overground lines are also not officially distinguished by individual names, unlike the Underground. Some services such as the Gospel Oak to Barking line is nicknamed colloquially as the "Goblin". Mayor of London Sadiq Khan in April 2022 pledged that he would invite Londoners to give all Overground lines individual names to reflect their "diverse history" if he be reelected in 2024.

Unlike other National Rail stations, London Overground stations which are not served by another National Rail operator now omit the red National Rail "double arrow" logo from signage outside the stations, using only the Overground roundel instead. A few refurbished or new stations on the reopened East London line display the station name in large orange three-dimensional uppercase letters.

Passenger numbers
Passenger numbers have grown very quickly since the start of London Overground in 2007. There were big increases in 2010/11 and 2011/12 due to the opening of the extensions of the East London line and South London line. The transfer of some suburban services from Liverpool Street in May 2015 from the Greater Anglia franchise to London Overground also distorted numbers, contributing to a very large growth between 2014/15 and 2015/16.

Rolling stock

Since the London Overground took over from Silverlink, TfL has pursued a programme of rolling-stock replacement in order to remove from service the ageing second-generation EMUs and Class 150 DMUs it inherited from Silverlink. By October 2010, the new rolling stock had completely replaced the units previously operated by Silverlink. The Class 313 and 150s were cascaded to other train operating companies Southern, First Capital Connect and First Great Western. The Class 508 units were stored at Eastleigh Works but were subsequently scrapped in 2013 after being deemed unfit.

Before its closure to become part of the London Overground, services on the East London line were operated with London Underground A60 and A62 Stock.

They include a number of tube-style features, including longitudinal seating and increased standing room to provide a high-capacity metro service. They also benefit from walk-through carriage interiors and air conditioning. The North London line has a base fleet of 24 four-car units, Class 378/2. However, these were delivered as three-car units (378/0), with the extended trains being introduced from September 2010, following platform extension works and delivery of the first 20 four-car units (378/1) for the East London line. A further 13 dual-voltage units were delivered to expand services, taking the total fleet to 57 four-car units. These trains are to be extended to five-car sets towards the end of 2014, starting with the East London line sets.

The trains are leased from newly formed rolling stock company (ROSCO) QW Rail Leasing until 2027. TfL planned initially to buy the new fleet outright, but in February 2008 announced that it would lease the trains in order to free up the £250 million capital cost of purchase, combined with reducing the risk of making a loss through any future sell-on of the fleet.

Eight two-car Class 172/0 units, leased from Angel Trains, entered service in 2010. At first their speed was restricted to  but the restriction was lifted when a test was found to be flawed.

TfL invited expressions of interest for a total of 39 four-car EMUs in April 2014, with 30 required for the Lea Valley lines, eight for the Gospel Oak to Barking line, and one for the Romford–Upminster line  all to replace older Class 172, Class 315 and Class 317 trains. Since then the planned procurement was increased to 45 four-car EMUs, with the additional six units intended for the Watford DC Line. In July 2015, TfL announced that it had placed a £260M order for 45 four-car Bombardier Aventra EMUs, with an option for 24 more, for use on the  Lea Valley lines and the Watford DC line, Gospel Oak to Barking line and Romford–Upminster line from 2018. Nine further units were ordered in February 2018, split between an additional three Class 710/2 units for use on the extended Gospel Oak to Barking line, and six 5-car units to allow Class 378 units to be cascaded to strengthened East London line services.

On 22 May 2019, TfL announced that approval had been gained for the Class 710s to enter passenger service. The first two units entered service on the Gospel Oak to Barking line on Thursday 23 May 2019 and the remaining six were in service by August 2019, with the first unit entering service on the Watford DC line on 9 September 2019. The first units on the Lea Valley lines entered service on 3 March 2020 after a first attempt on 24 February 2020. Their use on Romford–Upminster line services began in October 2020.

Current fleet

Past fleet
Former train types operated by London Overground include:

Livery

All Capitalstar and Aventra stock in service now carries Overground livery. It is similar to Underground livery, and consists of white and black coaches, a longitudinal thick blue stripe and a thin orange stripe along the bottom, London Overground roundels at midpoints along the coaches, black window-surrounds and orange doors. The ends of each Class 378 unit are painted yellow to comply with the National Rail standards that existed when the first wave of new trains began to enter service in 2009. However, Class 710 units do not have this as they were introduced into service after new standards released by the RSSB since most trains now have European-styled headlights allowing for better visibility from afar, unlike before when they needed the yellow fronts for visibility. The seat upholstery features a moquette by fabric designers Wallace Sewell.

As railway lines have been transferred to London Overground operation, services are sometimes operated using rolling stock inherited from the previous train operating company, and for a temporary period these trains have been branded with transitional livery until they are replaced with newer rolling stock. When the first London Overground services began, they were operated using Silverlink rolling stock which retained Silverlink's purple and lime green livery with yellow doors. The Silverlink logos were removed and Overground banners were added. This rolling stock was eventually completely replaced with new, Overground-branded trains.

Similarly, since the takeover of the Lea Valley lines, Overground services are being run with trains inherited from Abellio Greater Anglia which are mostly in a plain white livery with red doors. Prior to replacement of this rolling stock, the trains were repainted with full Overground livery and the interiors refurbished with Wallace Sewell upholstery and TfL standard signage and route maps.

In June 2018, London Overground unveiled its first complete Class 710 unit, complete with a newly designed livery and moquette. In October, it then began a programme to refresh the Class 378 fleet, giving them a livery designed to appear similar to the one designed for the Class 710.

Recent developments

Gospel Oak to Barking line

Electrification
It was announced in June 2013 that £115 million of funding for electrification was being made available as part of upgrades to rail infrastructure included in the government's 2013 spending round. At the same time Transport for London announced that they had obtained a £90 million commitment from the Chancellor of the Exchequer and the Secretary of State for Transport.

In September 2015, Network Rail awarded the £56.9m contract to electrify the line to J. Murphy & Sons. Part closures (on weekends and from South Tottenham to Barking) were planned from June to late September 2016, followed by a full closure from October to February 2017, and further evening and weekend works until late June 2017, and finally around four months of further work to add the wires so that electric Class 710 trains can run from early 2018. The line was to be electrified using the NR Series 2 OLE range.

Extension to Barking Riverside 
It was announced as part of the 2014 United Kingdom budget that the Gospel Oak to Barking line would be extended to Barking Riverside station. £263 million was to be spent to extend the line to the brownfield 10,800-home Barking Riverside housing development, which Barking and Dagenham Council did not believe to be viable without improved transport connections. The developers of the site, Barking Riverside Limited, would provide £172million towards the project, with the remainder coming from Transport for London. Construction started in 2017 and was planned to be completed by 2021. London Overground services started running to Barking Riverside on 18 July 2022.

Night service

London Overground began running 24-hour trains on Friday and Saturday nights, similar to the Night Tube of London Underground, between Dalston Junction and New Cross Gate from 15 December 2017. In February 2018 the service was extended to Highbury & Islington, which interchanges with overnight services of the Victoria line.

Proposed developments

Watford DC line move to Bakerloo

Had this change taken place,  and  would no longer have had direct services to Euston station, hindering access to central London.

The official Croxley Rail document states, "Bakerloo Line extension to Watford Unlikely" and "TfL’s plans to extend the Bakerloo Line to Watford Junction are on hold indefinitely due to funding and business case constraints".

Croxley Link
Plans were approved in 2011 for the Croxley Rail Link, diverting the Watford branch of London Underground's Metropolitan line to Watford Junction via , where it would share tracks with the Overground. However, in early 2017 this scheme was paused due to funding issues.

Old Oak Common interchange

A long-term plan exists to create an interchange with High Speed 2 at the proposed Old Oak Common station.

The station would also be served by Crossrail, Great Western Main Line services and Heathrow Express, and the proposals indicate the possibility of interchange with the Bakerloo and Central lines. The plans are supported by the London Borough of Hammersmith and Fulham.

In June 2013, the Mayor of London and the London Boroughs of Brent, Ealing and Hammersmith & Fulham released 'vision' consultation documents about the Old Oak Common area. These documents mention various connections to the London Overground system, linking Old Oak to the North London line, West London line, and to two new London Overground branches, to Hounslow, and – via the Dudding Hill Line – to Thameslink stations on the Midland Main Line.

If built, these stations would provide interchange between London Overground and Old Oak Common station.

Thamesmead extension
In addition to the plan to extend the Gospel Oak to Barking line to Barking Riverside, there are also proposals to extend it further under the River Thames to a station in Thamesmead, and then on Abbey Wood to connect with the Elizabeth line.

Transport for London has confirmed that the Mayor has asked them to look at both the Overground extension from Barking Riverside and a DLR extension, for connecting to Thamesmead.

Future acquisitions
Following the completion of the first phase of the London Overground network in December 2012, TfL has expressed its intention to take over the operation of other suburban lines in the London area. As with the original London Overground system, this would involve devolving National Rail services from the DfT's franchising system to a TfL-managed concession.

On 21 January 2016 it was announced consideration was being given to the possibility of gradually transferring the suburban services operated by Southeastern, South West Trains and Govia Thameslink Railway (Great Northern and Southern) to TfL to create a London Suburban Metro.

Past attempts on acquiring routes
In 2012–13 TfL and the Greater London Authority publicised a proposal for further expansion, identifying a number of services in North-East and South-East London as suitable candidates. The possibility of TfL acquiring routes out of London Bridge has also been discussed.

In October 2015 the prospect of London Overground expansion was raised again when the London Assembly Transport Committee published a report which advocated the devolution of a number of commuter rail services and the creation of a "South London Metro". In particular, the report identified four rail franchises due for renewal which could be taken over by TfL:
the Integrated Kent franchise (Southeastern metro services) out of Victoria/Charing Cross/Cannon Street/London Bridge to South East London suburbs

Kent County Council had initially expressed opposition to the Dartford route plans on account of limited capacity for Kent express trains being lost to expanded TfL services, but after negotiations with the London Assembly, reached an agreement to support the proposals.

Greenford branch
The Department for Transport has proposed that Transport for London should take over the Greenford to West Ealing line in West London. This would bring Greenford,  and  into the Overground network. Trains on this branch used to run directly to Paddington, but were curtailed at West Ealing in order to free up line capacity for the forthcoming Crossrail services, with West Ealing reconstructed to allow Greenford branch trains to terminate there. If this proposal were to go ahead, it would happen when the Greater Western franchise ends in 2023.

West London Orbital

Proposals to reopen the Dudding Hill Line to passenger services as part of the London Overground have been mooted for several years.

Crowd information 
In 2017 it was reported that a system is being trialled at Shoreditch High Street station that indicates the crowding in each train carriage. The technology, already in use on Thameslink trains, helps passengers find the least crowded carriage when boarding a train and should reduce dwell times at stations. If the trial is successful, it will be rolled out across the London Overground network.

See also

 Overground Network
 Orbirail
 Tramlink
 London Buses
 East London Transit
 Cycling in London
 Urban rail in the United Kingdom

References

Further reading
 Asher, Wayne (2015). A Very Political Railway – the rescue of the North London Line. 
 Glover, John (2013). London's Overground.

External links

 

 
London Rail
2007 establishments in England
2007 in London
Croydon 2020
Electric railways in the United Kingdom
Overground
Rail infrastructure in London
Railway operators in London
Urban ring railways